Lucas Carter Patrick (born July 30, 1993) is an American football guard for the Chicago Bears of the National Football League (NFL). He played college football at Duke.

Early years
Patrick played high school football at Brentwood High School in Brentwood, Tennessee and was a three-year letterman. His senior year in 2010, he earned Tennessee Sports Writers Association First-team 6A All-State honors, was named to The Tennessean’s Dream Team, was a team captain and played in the Toyota Tennessee East vs. West All-Star Classic on December 11, 2010. He also participated in track and field at Brentwood.

College career
Patrick lettered for the Duke Blue Devils of Duke University from 2012 to 2015. He was redshirted in 2011. On March 24, 2012, he had surgery to repair a fractured left ankle. Patrick missed the first eight games of the 2012 season while recovering from the surgery. He then played in the final five games of the season and played 137 snaps. He played in all 14 games, starting 1, in 2013 and played 340 snaps. Patrick's one start was at right tackle in place of the injured Perry Simmons in the Chick-fil-A Bowl. Patrick started 12 games at left guard, missed one game due to injury and played 633 snaps in 2014. He started all 13 games, played 1,067 snaps and recorded one solo tackle in 2015. He was named Honorable mention All-ACC by both the conference's head coaches and the Atlantic Coast Sports Media Association. Patrick also earned ESPN All-Bowl Team honors in 2015. He played in 44 games, starting 26, during his college career and played 2,211 snaps. In January 2017, Patrick played in the Tropic Bowl, a college football all-star game. He graduated from Duke in December 2015 with a degree in history.

Professional career
Patrick was rated the 36th best offensive guard in the 2016 NFL Draft by NFLDraftScout.com.

Green Bay Packers

After going undrafted, Patrick signed with the Green Bay Packers on June 1, 2016. He was waived by the Packers on September 3 and signed to the team's practice squad on September 5, 2016. He signed a reserve/future contract with the Packers on January 24, 2017.

Patrick made the Packers' final roster in 2017, playing in 12 games, starting two at guard.

He was re-signed on March 13, 2018.

On December 28, 2019, Patrick signed a two-year contract extension with the Packers. The next day, Patrick replaced an injured Corey Linsley at center during a Week 17 victory over the Detroit Lions, despite primarily playing as a guard for most of the season.

Chicago Bears
On March 16, 2022, Patrick signed a two-year contract with the Chicago Bears. Patrick announced he would play at Center for the Bears. However, Patrick started at Guard for the first 6 games of the 2022 season switching the guard position with fellow teammate Teven Jenkins due to Patrick dealing with an injury. Patrick would eventually get the starting job at Center by Week 7 against the New England Patriots on Monday but left the game in the first quarter with a toe injury. Patrick was placed on injured reserve on October 27 and was ruled out for the rest of the season.

References

External links

Chicago Bears bio
Duke Blue Devils bio

Living people
1993 births
American football offensive guards
Duke Blue Devils football players
Green Bay Packers players
Chicago Bears players
Players of American football from Tennessee
People from Brentwood, Tennessee